Seno, Séno or Senó may refer to:

Places 
 Séno Province, Burkina Faso
 Seno, Aragon, a town in Spain
 Seno Station, Hiroshima, Japan
 Seno, Laos, the location of the Royal Lao Air Force flying school
 Seno Skyring, an inland sound in Chile

People with the surname 
 Frank Seno (1921–1974), American football player

Fictional characters 
 Alice Seno/Seno Arisu and Mayura Seno, of Japanese manga Alice 19th

See also
 
 Sein (disambiguation)
 Senoi, an indigenous people of Malaysia